Johann Adolph Wedel (1675–1747) was a German professor of medicine.

Wedel was the son of Georg Wolfgang Wedel, also a physician. He received his Doctor of Medicine degree from the University of Jena in 1697. He published research works on camphor, fermentation, magnesium carbonate, the combustion of sulfur, and various medical issues.

References

External links
  Wedel, Johann Adolph 1675–1747 publications from WorldCat

1675 births
1747 deaths
University of Jena alumni
Academic staff of the University of Jena
17th-century German physicians
18th-century German physicians
18th-century German chemists